Pandaros is a genus of demosponge in the family Microcionidae. It contains the single species, Pandaros acanthifolium.

References

Animals described in 1864